Lian Hao (born 7 June 1995) is a Chinese para table tennis player. He is a three-time Paralympic gold medalist.

Lian was born with abnormalities in his right arm. He started the sport at the table tennis club ran by his uncle. He attended Shaanxi Normal University.

References

1995 births
Living people
Table tennis players at the 2016 Summer Paralympics
Table tennis players at the 2012 Summer Paralympics
Paralympic medalists in table tennis
Medalists at the 2012 Summer Paralympics
Medalists at the 2016 Summer Paralympics
Chinese male table tennis players
Paralympic gold medalists for China
Paralympic table tennis players of China
Table tennis players from Gansu
People from Lanzhou
Shaanxi Normal University alumni
Table tennis players at the 2020 Summer Paralympics
21st-century Chinese people